Étoile Sportive de Radès, often referred to as ESR is a basketball and football club from Radès, Tunisia. Founded in 1948, the team plays in blue and white colors. The team used to be called Union Sportive Radèsienne before 1965.

History

Football in Radès 
The city’s first football club was founded in 1924. It was La Radésienne, but this club only lived for three years. In 1931, a second club was born in the city: Aquila de Radès, which distinguished itself by winning the third division championship in Tunis and the suburbs in 1934, the year in which another club was created, the Radésienne Sports Union (USR), which in turn won the same title in 1935.

The two clubs found themselves in the second division and the city was entitled to its little derby. Training-oriented USR advance to the semi-finals of the 1936–37 Tunisian Cup. It gained great popularity at the expense of its rival L'Aquila, which was disbanded in 1938. But its momentum was halted by World War II. A new club, the Française de Radès, replaced her in 1942, before adopting a new name, the Sports Association of Radès. This club was open to different communities, but the nationalists created their own club in May 1948, the Etoile Sportive Radésienne, which became the first club in the city despite the short-lived rebirth of La Radésienne in 1954.

Club history 
Led by a first committee chaired by Hédi Dherif, with Kaddour Ben Jannet as secretary general and Abderrazak Ben Naceur as treasurer, the club quickly rose through the ranks by successively winning the division 6, 5 and 4 championships. He reached the quarter-finals of the Tunisian Cup 1953–54. Among the players of the time were Kaddour Ben Yeflah, Mahmoud Ben Mosbah, Khemais Hamia, Ezzeddine Rehouma, Mabrouk Fezzani, Ahmed Taggoug, Chedly Derouiche, Ahmed Ben Jannet, Mohamed Hamia, Mohamed Guezih, Moncef Foudhaili, Ali Ben Saâd, Hamadi Mrabet and Salah Hajri.

After independence, the club fluctuated between the second and fifth divisions, finding themselves relegated to second place behind the more successful basketball team. However, his two performances in the Tunisian Cup where he reached the quarter-finals twice: in 1957, where he was eliminated by Stade Tunisien 0–1, and in 1974, where he played two matches against ES Métlaoui 4–2. That year, the team was coached by a young yet unknown coach, Mrad Mahjoub, and made up of the following players: Noureddine Chebbi, Béchir Chikhaoui, Ali Missaoui, Hellal, Allala Ben Younes, Belhassen Sghaier, Mustapha Ferjani, Néjib Laâbidi, Néjib Ben Ali, Mohamed Ali Chaibi and Belgacem Hamdani.

The club changes its name three times. It became the Union sportive radésienne, following the merger with La Radésienne in 1964, then the Radès Transport Club following sponsorship by transport companies in 1968, before becoming the Etoile sportive de Radès again in 1976.

Personalities

Presidents 

  Hédi Dhraief (1948–1956)
  Taoufik Haouet (1957–1958)
  Baccar Jellouli (1958–1964)
  Abdallah Farhat (1964–1968)
  Mohamed Zaouali (1968–1969)
  Hédi Annabi (1969–1970)
  Raouf Menjour (1970–1972)
  Cherif Nabli
  Morched Ben Ali
  Raouf Menjour (1975–1981)
  Hédi Ben Romdhan (1982–1984)
  Azedine Beschaouch (1990–1993)
  Tahar Ben Zid (2006–2007)
  Hamadi Abdeljaoued (2007–2009)
  Ridha Ben Amor (2009–2011)
  Haykel Ben Amor (2011–2014)
  Mounir Laâdhari (2014–2015)
  Adel Ben Romdhane (since 2016)

Managers 

 1955–1957:  Noël Gallo
 1958–1959:  Salah Béji
 1959–1960:  Hédi Afchar
 1960–1961:  Ahmed Benelfoul &  Khemais Lakhal
 1965–1966:  Hmida Hajri &  Salah Béji
 1966–1971:  Salah Béji
 1971–1972:  Hédi Ben Romdhan
 1972–1976:  Mrad Mahjoub
 1976–1978:  Mohamed Salah Jedidi
 1978–1979:  Rafik Ammar
 1979–1980:  Zouhair Karoui
 1980–1981:  Slim Zlitni &  Youssef Amraoui
 1981–1982:  Abdelwahab Lahmar
 1982–1983:  Mohamed Salah Jedidi
 1983–1984:  Jilani Aouali &  Rejeb Sayeh
 1984–1985:  Tahar Bellamine &  Youssef Amraoui
 1985–1987:  Abid Mchala
 1987–1988:  Abdelaziz Seddik
 1988–1991:  Larbi Bezdah
 1991–1992:  Abdelaziz Seddik
 1992–1993:  Taoufik Skhiri &  Slim Ben Zid
 1993–1994:  Larbi Bezdah
 1994–1995:  Mahmoud Saâdi &  Tahar Ayari
 1995–1996:  Larbi Bezdah
 1996–1997:  Slim Ben Zid
 1997–1998:  Slim Ben Zid &  Salem Kraïem
 1998–1999:  Jamel Mouelhi
 2000–2002:  Larbi Bezdah &  Mohieddine Habita
 2002–2003:  Youssef Amraoui &  Abdelmajid Gobantini
 2003–2004:  Larbi Bezdah
 2004–2005:  Jamel Mouelhi &  Nabil Kouki
 2005–2007:  Larbi Bezdah
 2007–2008:  Larbi Bezdah &  Houcine Ayari
 2008–2011:  Allala Ben Younes
 2011–2012:  Nabil Gharsallah &  Tahar Bellamine
 2012–2013:  Hatem Chaffaï &  Slim Ben Zid
 2013–2015:  Allala Ben Younes
 2015–2016:  Mehrez Miladi
 2016–2017:  Allala Ben Younes
 2017:  Tarek Messaoudi &  Larbi Bezdah
 2017–:  Sassi Ouerfelli

See also

 Étoile Sportive de Radès (basketball)

References

External links
Official facebook page (football and basketball)

Football clubs in Tunisia
Sports clubs in Radès